Darrell Reed (born July 28, 1965) is a former American football defensive end who played for the Oklahoma Sooners.  He was drafted by the Green Bay Packers in the fifth round of the 1988 NFL Draft.

See also
 1985 Oklahoma Sooners football team

External links
 Oklahoma bio

Living people
American football defensive ends
Oklahoma Sooners football players
Green Bay Packers players
1965 births